Arturo Carranza (born 17 September 1953, date of death unknown) was a Salvadoran swimmer. He competed in three events at the 1968 Summer Olympics.

References

1953 births
Year of death missing
Salvadoran male swimmers
Olympic swimmers of El Salvador
Swimmers at the 1968 Summer Olympics
Sportspeople from San Salvador
20th-century Salvadoran people
21st-century Salvadoran people